There are two communities in Florida that use the name Nocatee:

 Nocatee, DeSoto County, Florida
 Nocatee, St. Johns County, Florida